A binary large object (BLOB or blob) is a collection of binary data stored as a single entity. Blobs are typically images, audio or other multimedia objects, though sometimes binary executable code is stored as a blob. They can exist as persistent values inside some databases or version control system, or exist at runtime as program variables in some programming languages. Blobs are not to be confused with binary files stored in a file system.

Blobs were originally just big amorphous chunks of data invented by Jim Starkey at DEC, who describes them as "the thing that ate Cincinnati, Cleveland, or whatever" from "the 1958 Steve McQueen movie", referring to The Blob. Later, Terry McKiever, a marketing person for Apollo, felt that it needed to be an acronym and invented the backronym Basic Large Object. Then Informix invented an alternative backronym, Binary Large Object.

The data type and definition were introduced to describe data not originally defined in traditional computer database systems, particularly because it was too large to store practically at the time the field of database systems was first being defined in the 1970s and 1980s. The data type became practical when disk space became cheap. This definition gained popularity with IBM Db2.

The term is used in NoSQL databases, especially in key-value store databases such as Redis. The term is also used by languages that allow runtime manipulation of Blobs, like JavaScript. 

The name "blob" is further borrowed by the deep learning software Caffe to represent multi-dimensional arrays.

In the world of free and open-source software, the term is also borrowed to refer to proprietary device drivers, which are distributed without their source code, exclusively through binary code; in such use, the term binary blob is common, even though the first letter in the blob abbreviation already stands for binary.

Depending on the implementation and culture around usage, the concept might be alternately referred to as a "basic large object" or "binary data type".

See also
 Binary blob
 Character large object

References

Databases
Data types